Head Records is an entertainment retailer based in Leamington Spa, England.

History
In 2007, prior to the formation of Head Records, Head opened its first store in a retail space vacated following the closure of the Fopp store in Leamington Spa.

Head subsequently opened three further stores. The Bristol Broadmead Zavvi, which had been taken up by Head Entertainment in 2009, closed on 27 March 2010, but was reopened a week later by Head Records under the name "Head CD DVD Books". The store contains some new stock alongside ex Zavvi stock; the product range includes clothing, and a selection of books alongside CDs and DVDs.

The former Zavvi store in Bromley was taken up by Head Records (as "Head CD & DVD"), some months after Head Entertainment had taken on its tranche of ex-Zavvi store sites. The Bromley store subsequently moved from the Zavvi site into another store location (a former Internacionale and previously Gamley's store), with the former Zavvi site being taken up by New Look. As with the Bristol store, the Bromley Head site carries a selection of new-release and catalogue products.

In December 2010, a new Head Records store opened in Belfast's Victoria Square, becoming the fourth store in the chain.

On 10 May 2011 Weston Mercury reported that Head was to open a new store in Weston-super-Mare's Sovereign Shopping Centre; this occupied a former Adams Childrenswear unit which had been used by HMV as a temporary store over Christmas 2010.

On 14 May 2011 Head officially opened. Nick Cooke, centre manager of the Sovereign Shopping Centre, said, "We are delighted that Head have chosen to open in Weston, which for too long has missed a dedicated music retailer." The WSM Head store had closed by early 2015, and in April 2015 the unit Head had occupied was taken up by a new Deichmann store.

On 15 January 2012 Head Records store closed in Belfast's Victoria Square. On 14 July 2012 the Belfast store reopened for business at a new location on Ann Street. It has since relocated again to CastleCourt shopping centre.

In September 2013 Head took up a presence in Warrington, hometown of Head founder Les Whitfield, when it began operating from premises in the Golden Square Shopping Centre, which had been vacated earlier that year by the closure of the town's store of HMV. Warrington's Head store closed in summer 2015 after HMV signed a deal to return to the same unit in Golden Square. The closure of the Warrington store reduced Head's estate to five stores.

In October 2014 Blackburn became the site of the sixth store of Head Records, when the company opened a new store in the former HMV unit in the town. In January 2016, however, the store closed down, after the temporary lease expired. Consequently, Head shrunk to five stores once again. In March 2016 it was announced The Entertainer would take presence in the former unit. The store opened the following month.

In 2015 the first store of Head Records opened in Wales, with the firm's opening of at Grand Arcade in the St. David's Shopping Development in Cardiff. On 22 December 2015, posters in the windows of the store in Bristol, revealed that the store would close for good on 8 January 2016, as well as a closing down sale. The closure of the store in Bristol meant the chain shrunk to four stores.

In February 2016 the Leamington Spa store relocated to a new shop unit, opposite the shop unit they were currently in.

The first Head store in the Republic of Ireland opened in the Liffey Valley shopping centre in Dublin in October 2016.

In February 2017 it was announced that Head's store in Bromley would be closing. The decision follows the sale of The Glades to new owners at the end of 2016: ahead of the sale Head had agreed terms with the outgoing operator (intu) for a new lease period - which would have seen the store receive a refit; however, after the sale the centre's new owners withdrew the offer of a new lease and let the unit to another operator - reported by Head founder Les Whitfield to be HMV, relocating from their existing Bromley premises at 90-92 High Street - with the Head store closing as a result. (HMV placed posters in their windows advertising relocation at around the same time as Head's closure announcement, though these confirmed only the closure of the current HMV - on 11 March - and did not give a new location or opening date for the new HMV store.) The relocated HMV will be staffed by employees of the existing HMV store, it's likely that current Head staff will lose their jobs as Head is not at this stage planning to relocate.

Around this time, the company was registered in Ireland to Vivid Fusion Ltd - a new company established by Les and Jayne Whitfield and in England by Indulge Retail Limited. 

In May 2017, it was revealed that the retailer was intending to open a shop in St. John's Shopping Centre, Liverpool in August 2017. No news had surfaced after this, so the plans were very likely scrapped.  In June 2017, the Cardiff store closed for the last time, leaving only three stores remaining. In August 2017, two new stores opened, both in the Republic of Ireland; one in Ilaic shopping centre, Dublin, the other in Corbett shopping centre, Galway city.

On 4 January 2018, Vivid Fusion and Indulge Retail Limited both filed for liquidation, which led to all the Head stores closing down permanently on the same day. 

On 19 June 2018, The Leamington Spa store reopened for business in 8 Lower Mall, Royal Priors Shopping Centre, under the new management of Simon Dullenty.

References

External links
 

Retail companies of the United Kingdom
Music retailers of the United Kingdom
Retail companies established in 2007